Collagen alpha-1(XIII) chain is a protein that in humans is encoded by the COL13A1 gene.

This gene encodes the alpha chain of one of the nonfibrillar collagens. The function of this gene product is not known, however, it has been detected at low levels in all connective tissue-producing cells so it may serve a general function in connective tissues. Unlike most of the collagens, which are secreted into the extracellular matrix, collagen XIII contains a transmembrane domain and the protein has been localized to the plasma membrane. The transcripts for this gene undergo complex and extensive splicing involving at least eight exons. Like other collagens, collagen XIII is a trimer; it is not known whether this trimer is composed of one or more than one alpha chain isomer. A number of alternatively spliced transcript variants have been described, but the full length nature of some of them has not been determined.
 Collagen XIII belongs to the transmembranous subfamily of collagens, like collagen XVII, XXIII and XXV.

References

Further reading